Romina Khurshid Alam (born 18 July 1976) is a Pakistani politician from the city of Gujranwala. She was elected to the National Assembly of Pakistan as a candidate of Pakistan Muslim League (N) (PML-N) on reserved seats for women from Punjab in 2013 Pakistani general election.

Early life
She was born on 18 July 1976 in Gujranwala.

She was born Christian but embraced Islam at an age of 43 years. She converted and announced through her official Twitter account on EidulAdha of 2020.

Career and achievements

She was elected to the National Assembly of Pakistan as a candidate of Pakistan Muslim League (N) (PML-N) on reserved seats for women from Punjab in 2013 Pakistani general election.

She was re-elected to the National Assembly as a candidate of PML-N on a seat reserved for women from Punjab in the 2018 Pakistani general election.

References

Living people
1976 births
Pakistan Muslim League (N) MNAs
People from Gujranwala
Pakistani MNAs 2013–2018
Women members of the National Assembly of Pakistan
Pakistani MNAs 2018–2023
21st-century Pakistani women politicians